The SS Northwestern, originally SS Oriziba, was a passenger and freight steamship launched in 1889 by the Delaware River Iron Ship Building and Engine Works, Chester, Pennsylvania which spent most of its career in service in the waters of the Territory of Alaska.  The ship from early in its career had a reputation for trouble, and was frequently involved in groundings, collisions with other ships, and with port facilities.  She first served as a transport in the West Indies as Oriziba, and was acquired by the Northwestern Steamship Company in 1906, sailed around Cape Horn, and renamed Northwestern. For the next thirty years she worked along the Alaska coast, transporting people, mail, and goods, as well as ore from mining operations at Kennecott.

On March 14, 1907, the steamer ran aground on a reef when a storm pushed her onto a reef in Beatson Bay near Latouche. Refloated sometime in April and docked at Latouche for temporary repairs. She departed 25 May 1907 for Esquimalt, British Columbia under tow by Tug . She fairly soon sprung a leak and was beached at Swanport near Port Valdez, sinking again. After more temporary repairs she was refloated and they started off again. On 4 June 1907 both Northwestern and her tow ran aground in fog at the Mouth of the Fraser River at Sand Head Shoal, she pulled herself off and then pulled off the Tug. She was repaired at Victoria, British Columbia.

Northwestern rescued seven crewmen from Nugget and transported them to Juneau.

On 3 December 1910 she ran hard aground on Pile Point at the entrance to False Bay tearing a 40 foot hole in her. refloated, repaired and returned to service.

In April, 1911 she participated in Cordova's "Copper Day" celebration commemorating the completion of the "Copper River and Northwestern Railroad" and first arrival of ore from the Kennicott Mine, she transported that shipment to Tacoma, Washington.

27 September 1911 on arrival at Ketchikan,  Alaska Territory the signal wire to the engine room broke ordering "Full Ahead" instead of "Stop" causing a collision with Salmon Canning ship , a former Clipper ship, doing minor damage to both.

In January, 1913 she ran aground near Vladez  Alaska Territory, in February she had a collision with "Skagit Queen", and on 12 September a collision with "H. B. Kennedy".

On 6 October 1915 she grounded on Potter Rock just south of Pennock Island in the Tongass Narrows near Ketchikan,  Alaska Territory. She got off the next morning.

On 25 July 1933,  Northwestern ran aground off Alaska's Sentinel Island Lighthouse and subsequently was beached on the Eagle River Sand Spit. Her  passengers were taken off by a United States Government steamship.

Northwestern was pressed into service by the United States Navy during World War II, and was serving as housing for workers at Dutch Harbor on Unalaska when the area was bombed by the Japanese in June 1942.  On 4 June a bomb struck her, inflicting extensive damage. Her hulk afterward was loaded with scrap and towed to Captains Bay in anticipation of eventually being towed to Seattle, Washington.  Despite U.S. Navy records indicating that she was towed to Seattle, she in fact remained in Captains Bay, and eventually sank around 1946; there are differing accounts as to the circumstances of the sinking.  Approximately  of her hull is normally visible at the head of Captains Bay.

The site of the shipwreck was listed on the National Register of Historic Places in 1994.

References

See also
National Register of Historic Places listings in Aleutians West Census Area, Alaska

1889 ships
Maritime incidents in 1933
Maritime incidents in June 1942
Ships built by the Delaware River Iron Ship Building and Engine Works
Shipwrecks of the Alaska coast
Steamships of the United States Navy
Ships of the Aleutian Islands campaign
World War II auxiliary ships of the United States
World War II shipwrecks in the Pacific Ocean